Atiyyah ( ‘aṭiyyah), which generally implies "something (money or goods given as regarded) received as a gift" or also means "present, gift, benefit, boon, favor, granting, giving".

The name is also spelt Ateah, Atiyeh, Attiah, Attieh, Atieh, Atiya, Atiyya, Attiya, Attiyah, Attyé or Ateya, Attua, Antuya, Atia.  

It may refer to:

Surname

Academics
 Aziz Suryal Atiya (1898-1988), Coptic historian and scholar and an expert in Islamic and Crusades studies
 Sir Michael Atiyah (1929–2019), British mathematician, brother of Patrick
 Patrick Atiyah (1931-2018), English barrister and legal writer, brother of Michael
 George N. Atiyeh (1923–2008), Lebanese librarian

Authors and journalists
 Jarir ibn Atiyah (c. 650 – c. 728), Arab poet and satirist
 Edward Atiyah (1903–1964), Lebanese born writer, father of Michael and Patrick
 Karen Attiah (born August 12, 1986), writer, journalist and editor

Arts and entertainment
 Assane Attyé (born 1983), French singer of Lebanese origin known as Ycare
 Atiye or Atiye Deniz (born 1988), Turkish-German singer
 Joseph Attieh (born 1986), Lebanese singer
  (born 1975), Israeli actress
 Rania Attieh, Lebanese-American filmmaker
 Rouwaida Attieh (born 1982), Syrian vocalist

Politics and government
 Abdul Rahman bin Hamad Al Attiyah (born 1950), Qatari diplomat
 Abdullah bin Hamad Al Attiyah (born 1951), Qatari government minister
 Atiye Sultan (1824-1850), Ottoman princess
 Hamad bin Ali Al Attiyah, Qatari State Minister for Defense in 2013
 Khaled al-Attiyah (born 1949), Iraqi politician, First Deputy Speaker of the Iraqi National Assembly in 2006
 Khalid bin Mohammad Al Attiyah (born 1967), Qatari government minister
 Rawya Ateya (1926–1997), Egyptian who became the first female parliamentarian in the Arab world
 Victor G. Atiyeh (1923–2014), American politician
 Ziri ibn Atiyya (died 1001), Maghrawa Berber tribal leader

Religion
 Ezra Attiya (1887–1970), Sephardic teacher of Torah
 Ignatius III Atiyah (died 1634), Melkite Patriarch of Antioch

Sports
 Alaa' Attieh (born 1990), Palestinian football (soccer) player 
 Dennis Atiyeh (born 1963), Syrian wrestler
 Joseph Atiyeh (born 1957), Syrian wrestler
 Khalil Bani Attiah (born 1991), Jordanian footballer
 Mohammad Attiah (born 1950), Ghanaian football (soccer) player
 Mohammed Attiyah (born 1992), Saudi footballer
 Nasser Al-Attiyah (born 1970), Qatari rally driver and sport shooter
 Saad Attiya (born 1987), Iraqi football (soccer) player

Given name
 Atiyya ibn Sa'd (died 729), transmitter of hadith, exegete of the Qur'an
 Attiya Al-Qahtani (born 1953), Saudi Arabian runner
 Mullah Attiya al-Jamri (1899–1981), Bahraini khatib and poet
 Shuhdi Atiya ash-Shafi (died 1960), Egyptian communist theoretician and activist
 Atiyah Abd al-Rahman (1970–2011), Libyan purported to be a member of al-Qaeda and related militant groups
 Attiya Dawood (born 1958), Pakistani poet, writer, feminist and activist
 Ateya El-Belqasy  (born 1984), Egyptian footballer
 Atiyyah Ellison (born 1981), American footballer
 Atiya Fyzee (1877–1967), Indian author
 Attiya Inayatullah, Pakistani politician
 Attiya Waris (born 1974), Kenyan academic and reform advocate

See also
 Atia (disambiguation)
 Atias
 Attia
 Attias

Arabic-language surnames